Pine Hills is a census-designated place (CDP) in Humboldt County, California, United States, adjacent to Eureka. The population was 3,131 at the 2010 census, up from 3,108 at the 2000 census. Pine Hills includes areas like Ridgewood and areas as far south as the small neighborhood of Elk River. An area near this artificial census construct is called Pine Hill by Local government agencies and officials. Pine Hill is a much smaller area than "Pine Hills" and as defined by local agencies is actually within an adjacent CDP named Bayview.

Geography

Demographics

2010
The 2010 United States Census reported that Pine Hills had a population of 3,131. The racial makeup of Pine Hills was 2,648 (84.6%) White, 22 (0.7%) African American, 86 (2.7%) Native American, 116 (3.7%) Asian, 4 (0.1%) Pacific Islander, 72 (2.3%) from other races, and 183 (5.8%) from two or more races. Hispanic or Latino of any race were 220 persons (7.0%).

The Census reported that 3,112 people (99.4% of the population) lived in households, 19 (0.6%) lived in non-institutionalized group quarters, and 0 (0%) were institutionalized.

There were 1,261 households, out of which 357 (28.3%) had children under the age of 18 living in them, 706 (56.0%) were opposite-sex married couples living together, 91 (7.2%) had a female householder with no husband present, 68 (5.4%) had a male householder with no wife present.  There were 93 (7.4%) unmarried opposite-sex partnerships, and 11 (0.9%) same-sex married couples or partnerships. 282 households (22.4%) were made up of individuals, and 115 (9.1%) had someone living alone who was 65 years of age or older. The average household size was 2.47.  There were 865 families (68.6% of all households); the average family size was 2.89.

The population was spread out, with 645 people (20.6%) under the age of 18, 239 people (7.6%) aged 18 to 24, 662 people (21.1%) aged 25 to 44, 1,051 people (33.6%) aged 45 to 64, and 534 people (17.1%) who were 65 years of age or older.  The median age was 45.6 years. For every 100 females, there were 99.9 males.  For every 100 females age 18 and over, there were 100.0 males.

The homeowner vacancy rate was 1.2%; the rental vacancy rate was 3.8%.  2,308 people (73.7% of the population) lived in owner-occupied housing units and 804 people (25.7%) lived in rental housing units.

2000
As of the census of 2000, there were 3,108 people, 1,199 households, and 888 families residing in the CDP. The racial makeup of the CDP was 89.61% White, 0.55% Black or African American, 2.61% Native American, 1.61% Asian, 0.29% Pacific Islander, 1.09% from other races, and 4.25% from two or more races.  4.60% of the population were Hispanic or Latino of any race.

There were 1,199 households, out of which 33.1% had children under the age of 18 living with them, 62.5% were married couples living together, 8.1% had a female householder with no husband present, and 25.9% were non-families. 19.1% of all households were made up of individuals, and 6.6% had someone living alone who was 65 years of age or older.  The average household size was 2.59 and the average family size was 2.94.

In the CDP, the population was spread out, with 25.0% under the age of 18, 7.3% from 18 to 24, 25.9% from 25 to 44, 29.6% from 45 to 64, and 12.2% who were 65 years of age or older.  The median age was 40 years. For every 100 females, there were 93.5 males.  For every 100 females age 18 and over, there were 93.7 males.

The median income for a household in the CDP was $43,527, and the median income for a family was $49,000. Males had a median income of $36,746 versus $30,735 for females. The per capita income for the CDP was $20,786.  About 6.8% of families and 9.6% of the population were below the poverty line, including 11.7% of those under age 18 and 3.2% of those age 65 or over.

Politics

See also

References

Eureka, California
Census-designated places in Humboldt County, California
Census-designated places in California